Tom Bertram (born 30 March 1987 in Halle (Saale)) is a German former professional footballer who played as a defender. He has worked as announcer since 2014 for FC Rot-Weiß Erfurt.

References

External links
 

1987 births
Living people
Sportspeople from Halle (Saale)
People from Bezirk Halle
German footballers
Footballers from Saxony-Anhalt
Germany under-21 international footballers
Association football defenders
2. Bundesliga players
3. Liga players
FC Rot-Weiß Erfurt players
SpVgg Greuther Fürth players
SC Paderborn 07 players
20th-century German people
21st-century German people